The Shire of Warwick was a local government area in the Darling Downs region of Queensland, Australia.  The administrative centre and major town of the shire was the town of Warwick.

History
On 19 March 1992, the Electoral and Administrative Review Commission, created two years earlier, produced its report External Boundaries of Local Authorities, and recommended that local government boundaries in the Warwick area be rationalised into three new local government areas.  That recommendation was not implemented, but the City of Warwick was merged with the Shires of Allora, Glengallan and Rosenthal to form the new Shire of Warwick. The Local Government (Allora, Glengallan, Rosenthal and Warwick) Regulation 1994 was gazetted on 20 May 1994. On 25 June, an election was held for the new council, and on 1 July 1994, the Shire of Warwick was established.

Under the local council amalgamation programme instigated by the Queensland Government in 2007, the Shires of Stanthorpe and Warwick were merged in March 2008 to create the Southern Downs Region.

Towns and localities
The Shire of Warwick included the following settlements:

Warwick area:
 Warwick

Allora area:
 Allora
 Berat
 Clintonvale
 Deuchar
 Ellinthorp
 Goomburra
 Hendon
 Mount Marshall
 Talgai
 Willowvale*

Glengallan area:
 Killarney
 Canningvale
 Elbow Valley
 Emu Vale
 Freestone
 Gladfield
 Glengallan
 Junabee
 Maryvale
 Morgan Park
 Mount Colliery
 Mount Sturt
 Mount Tabor
 Sladevale
 Swanfels
 Tannymorel
 The Falls
 Tregony
 Wiyarra
 Womina
 Yangan

Rosenthal area:
 Rosenthal Heights
 Allan
 Cunningham
 Dalveen
 Greymare
 Karara
 Leslie
 Leslie Dam
 Leyburn
 Palgrave
 Pratten
 Rosehill
 Thane
 Wheatvale

* Not to be confused with Willow Vale, Queensland

Population

* From time series data

Mayors
 Bruce Green
 Ron Bellingham

References 

Former local government areas of Queensland
Darling Downs
Warwick, Queensland
2008 disestablishments in Australia
Populated places disestablished in 2008